Hylophorbus richardsi is a species of frog in the family Microhylidae.

It is endemic to Papua New Guinea.
Its natural habitat is subtropical or tropical moist montane forests.

Sources

Hylophorbus
Amphibians of Papua New Guinea
Amphibians described in 2001
Taxonomy articles created by Polbot